Pape Latyr N'Diaye (born April 4, 1985) is a Senegalese football who player currently plays for Persidafon Dafonsoro in the Indonesia Super League.

References

1985 births
Living people
Senegalese footballers
Senegalese expatriate footballers
Expatriate footballers in Indonesia
Expatriate footballers in Egypt
Liga 1 (Indonesia) players
PSPS Pekanbaru players
Al Dhafra FC players
Kawkab Marrakech players
UAE Pro League players
Association football forwards